Brooklyn Bazaar is Scott Tixier's debut album recorded in Brooklyn in September 2011 and co-produced by Jean-Luc Ponty and Mark Feldman. It was released in March 2012 by Sunnyside Records and was well received by critics (NPR "Song of the day"; "Coup De Coeur" Fnac; The New York City Jazz Record;). Brooklyn Bazaar was listed in the JazzTimes Top 50 CDs of 2012.

Track listing
All songs by Scott Tixier
"Keep in Touch" – 6:02
"Bushwick Party" – 5:45
"Arawaks" – 4:12
"Elephant Rose" – 6:38
"String Theory" – 6:06
"Miss Katsu" – 4:58
"Facing Windows" – 7:20
"Shopping with Mark F" – 5:17
"Roach Dance" – 5:16

Personnel 
Scott Tixier – violin
Douglas Bradford – guitars
Jesse Elder – electric keyboards and acoustic piano
Massimo Biolcati – bass
Arthur Vint – drums
Emilie Weibel – vocal

Technical Credits
Dave Darlington (2 Grammy Awards) - Mixing/Mastering
François Zalacain - Executive Producer
Rob Mosher - Producer
Mike Marciano (2 Grammy Awards) - Engineer
Bryan Parker - Film director
Gregg Conde - Cinematography
Erik Haberfeld - Graphic Design
Corelli Savarez - Executive Producer
Chell Stephen - Cinematography
Mark Feldman - Quotation Author
Jean-Luc Ponty - Quotation Author

References

External links 
 Official artist website
 Official record label website

Scott Tixier albums
2012 debut albums
Sunnyside Records albums